Rashadat Akhundov (born on August 7, 1984, Beylagan) is a youth activist and co-founder of N!DA Civic Movement. He was arrested on March 30, 2013 a few days after the protests held in Baku against the non-combat deaths in the military. Akhundov was accused in preparing the riots during the protests. International human rights organization, Amnesty International recognized him as a prisoner of conscience. He was sentenced to 8 years of imprisonment on May 6, 2014, but later pardoned and released on March 17, 2016 being imprisoned for three years.

Education
Akhundov has graduated from Ali-Bayramli Private Turkish High School in 2001. Thereafter, he studied BSc in International Economic Relations at Azerbaijan State Economic University where he was in the special talents group specializing in finance and accounting. After successfully completing his bachelor studies in Baku, he headed to Budapest in order to do his master. Akhundov graduated from CEU Business School and obtained Master of Business Administration degree in 2007.

Activity 

In early years of his activism Akhundov joined Yox! Movement in 2005 and was one of the leading members. Then starting from 2006 he continued his activity in OL! Azerbaijani Youth Movement. He even managed to become a member of the board for a period of time. Akhundov's activity in OL! ended up in 2010. At the same time, he was one of the founders of the Youth Rights Protection Movement initiated to protect youth activists Adnan Hajizadeh and Emin Milli whose arrest was politically motivated. He was detained for a few days for several times due to his active participation in the street protests in 2010 and 2011.

Akhundov is a co-founder of Nida Civic Movement and was one out of seven board members when he was arrested in March 2013.

Personal life 
He is married and has a son who was born after his arrest in 2013. Akhundov used to work for BP as a finance analyst in Baku.

See also 
 Nida Civic Movement
 Zaur Gurbanli
 Rashad Hasanov
 Uzeyir Mammadli

References 

1984 births
Living people
Azerbaijani democracy activists
Amnesty International prisoners of conscience held by Azerbaijan
Azerbaijani prisoners and detainees
Central European University alumni
BP people
Recipients of Azerbaijani presidential pardons